Chaochow Guy is a 1972 Taiwanese and Hong Kong film of the Martial Arts genre. It is directed by Gam Sing-Yan and stars Tien Peng, Nancy Yen Nan-See, Wang Kuan Hsiung aka Wong Goon-Hung, Wong Fei-Lung, Lee Keung, Poon Chuen-Ling, Blacky Ko Sau-Leung, Chan San-Yat, Ko Jan-Pang and Wong Hoi. This was also Wang Kuan Hsiung's first film.

References

1972 films
Taiwanese martial arts films
1970s action films
1970s Mandarin-language films

Hong Kong martial arts films
1970s Hong Kong films